Matthew Steven Lehr (born April 25, 1979) is a former American football guard in the National Football League for the Dallas Cowboys, St. Louis Rams, Atlanta Falcons, Tampa Bay Buccaneers and New Orleans Saints. He was selected by the Dallas Cowboys in the fifth round of the 2001 NFL Draft. He played college football at Virginia Tech.

Early years
Lehr attended Woodbridge High School, where he was a two-way player at offensive guard and defensive end. He was a three-time All-District and All-Northwest selection. As a junior, he received second-team All-state honors.

As a senior, he posted 40 tackles and 6 sacks, while being named to the All-state team. He was also an All-State selection in the shot put.

College career
Lehr accepted a football scholarship from Virginia Tech. He appeared in 4 games as a freshman. The next year, he missed the first 2 games with an ankle injury, and became a starter at guard in the 10th game of the season against Rutgers University, blocking for quarterback Michael Vick. 

As a junior, he was the regular starter at left guard, on a team that played in the BCS National Championship Game against Florida State University. He allowed only one sack and 3 quarterback pressures, leading the team with 57 knockdown blocks. 

As a senior, he helped his team break the conference's rushing record with 270.5 rushing yards-per-game, which was also set by Virginia Tech the previous year. He surrendered only half a sack and 5 quarterback pressures, leading the team with 57 knockdown blocks.

Professional career

Dallas Cowboys
Lehr was selected in the fifth round (137th overall) of the 2001 NFL Draft by the Dallas Cowboys. Although he only played guard in college, he was expected to be the eventual replacement for Mark Stepnoski at center.

Lehr struggled during his time with the Cowboys because he lacked size and strength. As a rookie, he played eight games as a backup guard. In 2002, he was beat by Andre Gurode for the starting center position and Lehr remained mainly as a backup at guard and center, making 4 starts (2 in each position). 

In 2003, Gurode was moved to guard and rookie Al Johnson missed the season with a right knee injury, which opened the door for Lehr to start 16 games at center on a team that made the playoffs. The next year, Johnson regained the starting center position and Lehr only started 2 games at  right guard. On December 28, 2004, he was waived to create room to promote players from the practice squad.

St. Louis Rams
In 2004, he was claimed off waivers by the St. Louis Rams, but was inactive for the season finale and their two playoff games.

Atlanta Falcons
On March 11, 2005, he signed as a free agent with the Atlanta Falcons to help replace guard Roberto Garza. He started 15 games at left guard. The next year, he remained a starter, but was suspended for 4 games due to violating the NFL Substance Abuse Policy. On November 20, he returned to start the remaining games of the season. He was released on March 5, 2007.

Tampa Bay Buccaneers
On February 5, 2007, he signed as a free agent with the Tampa Bay Buccaneers, to compete for the left guard position, while Dan Buenning recovered from knee surgery. He played in all 16 games, but was used mostly on special teams. He wasn't re-signed after the season.

New Orleans Saints
On March 22, 2008, he signed with the New Orleans Saints reuniting him with head coach and former Cowboys offensive coordinator Sean Payton. On September 7 he was cut and re-signed 2 days later. On September 13, he was released and re-signed 4 days later. 

He appeared in 13 contests and started 3 games in place of center Jonathan Goodwin, who was sidelined with a partially dislocated kneecap. He wasn't re-signed after the season.

Tennessee Titans
On August 25, 2009, he was signed as a free agent by the Tennessee Titans. He was released on September 1.

Personal life
Lehr picked up the sport of bodybuilding and trained regularly with IFBB Pro Branch Warren.
Lehr lives in the Dallas area.

References

1979 births
Living people
People from Woodbridge, Virginia
Players of American football from Virginia
American football centers
American football offensive guards
Virginia Tech Hokies football players
Dallas Cowboys players
St. Louis Rams players
Atlanta Falcons players
Tampa Bay Buccaneers players
New Orleans Saints players
American sportspeople in doping cases
Doping cases in American football